Mende Cathedral (French: Basilique-cathédrale Notre-Dame-et-Saint-Privat de Mende) is a Roman Catholic cathedral and minor basilica, and also a national monument of France, located in the town of Mende. The cathedral enshrines the venerated image of the Black Madonna of Mende which was crowned on 15 August 1894 by the decree of Pope Leo XIII dated 18 December 1893.

It is the seat of the Bishop of Mende.

External links

Location

Churches in Lozère
Roman Catholic cathedrals in France
Basilica churches in France